Amr El Manzalawy El Hadidy (born 24 December 1969) is a former footballer of Egypt national football team.

Club career
Amr spent his professional career in the Egyptian Premier League with Ghazl El Mahalla SC and Al-Ahly.

International career
Amr was a member in Egypt team in 1992 Summer Olympics.

References

External links
 
 

1969 births
Living people
Egyptian footballers
Egypt international footballers
Footballers at the 1992 Summer Olympics
Olympic footballers of Egypt
Al Ahly SC players
Eastern Company SC players
Egyptian Premier League players
Association football defenders